Sitochroa subtilis is a moth in the family Crambidae. It was described by Ivan Nikolayevich Filipjev in 1927. It is found in Russia.

References

Moths described in 1927
Pyraustinae